is a fictional character and the protagonist from Ken Akamatsu's manga and anime Love Hina. He is voiced by Yūji Ueda (Japanese) and Derek Stephen Prince (English). His name is inspired by Keitarō Arima as well as the mythological character Urashima Tarō.

Fictional character biography
Keitarō Urashima is 19/20-year-old cram school student who is desperately trying to get into University of Tokyo (Tōkyō daigaku, often abbreviated to Tōdai) because of a promise he had made fifteen years earlier to his first love. This promise, that if two people who love each other and go to Tokyo University together they will live happily ever after, is what keeps Keitarō focused and determined, even though he can not remember the name or face of the girl with whom he made the promise to.

Hinata's residence is a hotel called the Hinata House, located at 1 Hinata Street; what he does not know at this time is that the hotel had been converted into a girls-only dormitory. Despite an embarrassing and painful run with the residents which almost forces him to leave, he stays upon finding out that Hinata has given him the title and deed to the Hinata establishment. As the new landlord and manager, he must oversee and maintain the residence, a fact which upsets the girls. Even though the girls think of him as a pervert, over time he wins them over with his good-natured personality and constant perseverance even under dire pressure. Whereas in the anime he has a skill for drawing, particularly women, in the manga his main specialty is cooking chocolate dishes; he even boasted in the second volume that his skill can easily match that of any real chef's. One of his favorite hobbies is collecting photobooth pictures, which are, however, almost only of himself (except for two of him with Naru).

In the manga, after a trip with Seta to the USA, Keitarō becomes a skilled martial artist. He is able to match Motoko and on occasion defeats her in battle. Under Seta's wing, he becomes an impressive archaeologist, gaining Seta's uncanny ability to pull artifacts out of the ground practically anywhere. However, he also adopted Seta's bad driving habits and as well suffers from night blindness. His growth in character is picked up by the girls, who begin to develop even larger crushes on him. His developing relationship with Naru is one of the focal points in the story.

On the fourth attempt (he failed a third time as the story goes on), he finally gets accepted into Tokyo U, then proposes to Naru. Despite attempts from the other girls to capture his heart, Keitarō's feelings for Naru are unwavering. In Chapter 121, it is revealed that she is the girl he made the promise to 15 years ago. He, Naru, and Mutsumi were all in that fateful sandbox and that Hinata says that he should hang onto "that girl beside him," signifying Naru. He becomes a renowned archaeologist and successor to Seta's studies.

After three years and a very long engagement the two finally get married. His luck, though, has not changed much as he is last seen being chased by Naru after accidentally tearing off her wedding dress while heading to their honeymoon though considering their expressions it is implied that this was done more as "for old times sake".

Personality
Keitarō is extremely kind-hearted and can always be counted on to help out when a friend is in trouble. He has a well-meaning personality, is constantly friendly, dedicated to his studies, and has a genuine concern for all of his friends.

He is luckless around women and is the subject of their violent attacks whenever he accidentally sees them naked or trips and touches them inappropriately. Despite such savage beatings, he is incredibly resilient (even a rocket does not do real harm). There is a joke in Volume 12 of the Manga that Keitarō is gifted with immortality, when he tells Naru that she probably would not survive the fall but he would.

After the few years time skip at the end of the manga, it seems his behavior became more like Seta's.

Notes and references

Love Hina
Anime and manga characters with superhuman strength
Fictional archaeologists
Fictional managers
Fictional fortune tellers
Fictional college students
Comics characters introduced in 1998
Fictional Japanese people in anime and manga